Two by-elections were held for the constituency of Blaenau Gwent in Wales following the death of Member of Parliament and Assembly Member Peter Law on 25 April 2006. As Law was the MP and Assembly Member (AM), his death required by-elections in both the parliamentary seat and the equivalent Welsh Assembly constituency. The two elections polled on the same day, 29 June, as a by-election in Bromley and Chislehurst. A win by the Labour Party in the AM by-election would have restored their majority in the Welsh Assembly, which was lost when Law was expelled from the party.

Law's successors won both seats: the independent Dai Davies, Law's former election agent, won the Westminster seat with a majority of about two and a half thousand. He was the first independent to hold a seat previously occupied by an independent since Sir Charles Vere Ferrers Townshend held The Wrekin in 1920. Meanwhile, Law's widow, Trish Law, was elected to her husband's former seat in the Welsh Assembly.

Westminster by-election
The writ for the UK Parliament by-election was moved on 6 June so that it would be held on the same date as the Assembly by-election, (29 June 2006). Labour whips had reportedly pressed for the election to be held on 25 May. The movement of the writ was more complicated because Law sat as an Independent, and therefore the convention that the party of the former member moves the writ cannot apply. According to the precedent (when Dennis Canavan resigned his Parliamentary seat at Westminster as an Independent), the whip of the governing party moves the writ.

Candidates
Maggie Jones, the Labour candidate who had been defeated by Law at the 2005 general election, was not able to stand, because she had been elevated to the House of Lords. There had been speculation about an independent candidate running with the backing of the Conservatives, Liberal Democrats and Plaid Cymru, but all three parties decided to contest the election.

It had been reported that prior to Law's death that the Labour Party had decided against selecting their candidate for the next general election with an all-women shortlist. It was the use of such a shortlist for the 2005 general election that led to Law standing as an independent. Labour instead left the selection to the local party. The Labour candidate, Owen Smith, was chosen on 8 May. He was a former special adviser and BBC producer who worked for a pharmaceutical company. After losing this by-election, Smith went on to become MP for Pontypridd at the 2010 general election, and in 2016 launched an unsuccessful campaign to lead the Labour party, remaining in Parliament until the 2019 general election.

The Liberal Democrat candidate was Amy Kitcher. The Conservatives stood Margrit Williams, who worked for Sir Malcolm Rifkind. Dai Davies, Peter Law's former agent, stood as an independent with the support of the Blaenau Gwent People's Voice Group.

Despite contesting both the previous Assembly and Parliamentary elections, the United Kingdom Independence Party decided not to stand a candidate, instead calling for a vote for the Blaenau Gwent People's Voice Group - even though the Group does not support withdrawal from the European Union, nor the abolition of the Welsh Assembly, key UKIP policies.

The Conservative fifth place was their worst position in a UK mainland by-election since at least 1945.

Result

Welsh Assembly by-election
The Assembly by-election had to be held within twelve weeks of the vacancy arising. It was announced on 11 May 2006 that the Assembly by-election would be held on 29 June.

Candidates

Labour chose John Hopkins, who had already been selected as their 2007 Assembly election candidate, to contest the seat. John Price stood for Plaid Cymru. The Liberal Democrats fielded Steve Bard, a councillor in Abertillery. The Conservative candidate was Jonathan Burns, a Cardiff councillor. Peter Law's widow, Trish Law, stood as an independent backed by the Blaenau Gwent People's Voice Group.

The Green Party fought the Assembly election but did not stand at Westminster.

Result

Electorate and campaign timetables
The electorate for the constituency was 52,900 as quoted by the Returning Officer's Department of Blaenau Gwent Borough Council on 14 May 2006 (-0.75% on the Westminster election and -0.05% on the Assembly election). The close of nominations for the Assembly constituency was on 2 June and for the Westminster seat 14 June.

Campaigns
On 27 April 2006, BBC News published allegations by Peter Law's widow that Law had believed he would be in line for a peerage should he decide not to stand in the 2005 general election. The Labour Party denied that a peerage was offered.

Welsh Secretary Peter Hain attempted to build bridges with Law's supporters by apologising for imposing an all-women shortlist and suggesting that those expelled from the Labour Party might be able to rejoin. This apology was rejected by Dai Davies, Peter Law's agent and putative successor, as coming too late and being a cynical ploy to try to win the by-elections.

Opinion polls
An opinion poll was conducted by GfK NOP between 24 May and 28 May, which asked 1,000 voters in the constituency how they would vote. The results were:

Westminster
{| border=1 cellpadding=4 cellspacing=0 style="margin: 1em 1em 1em 0; background: #f9f9f9; border: 1px #aaa solid; border-collapse: collapse; font-size: 95%; clear:both"
|- style="background-color:#E9E9E9"
! colspan=4|House of Commons seat poll
|- style="background-color:#E9E9E9"
! colspan=2 style="width: 130px"|Party
! style="width: 170px"|Candidate
! style="width: 40px"|%
|-

|-
! style="background-color: " |
| style="width: 130px" | 
|               | Owen Smith
| style="text-align: right; margin-right: 0.5em" | 47%
|-

|-
! style="background-color: " |
| style="width: 130px" | 
|               | Dai Davies
| style="text-align: right; margin-right: 0.5em" | 35%
|-

|-
! style="background-color: " |
| style="width: 130px" | 
|               | Amy Kitcher
| style="text-align: right; margin-right: 0.5em" | 6%
|-

|-
! style="background-color: " |
| style="width: 130px" | 
|               | Steffan Lewis
| style="text-align: right; margin-right: 0.5em" | 6%
|-

|-
! style="background-color: " |
| style="width: 130px" | 
|               | Margrit Williams
| style="text-align: right; margin-right: 0.5em" | 5%
|-

|}

Assembly
{| border=1 cellpadding=4 cellspacing=0 style="margin: 1em 1em 1em 0; background: #f9f9f9; border: 1px #aaa solid; border-collapse: collapse; font-size: 95%; clear:both"
|- style="background-color:#E9E9E9"
! colspan=4|Welsh Assembly seat poll
|- style="background-color:#E9E9E9"
! colspan=2 style="width: 130px"|Party
! style="width: 170px"|Candidate
! style="width: 40px"|%
|-

|-
! style="background-color: " |
| style="width: 130px" | 
|               | Trish Law
| style="text-align: right; margin-right: 0.5em" | 43%
|-

|-
! style="background-color: " |
| style="width: 130px" | 
|               | John Hopkins
| style="text-align: right; margin-right: 0.5em" | 40%
|-

|-

! style="background-color: " |
| style="width: 130px" | 
|               | John Price
| style="text-align: right; margin-right: 0.5em" | 6%
|-

|-
! style="background-color: " |
| style="width: 130px" | 
|               | Steve Bard
| style="text-align: right; margin-right: 0.5em" | 6%
|-

|-
! style="background-color: " |
| style="width: 130px" | 
|               | Jonathan Burns
| style="text-align: right; margin-right: 0.5em" | 3%
|-

|-
! style="background-color: " |
| style="width: 130px" | 
|               | John Matthews
| style="text-align: right; margin-right: 0.5em" | 2%
|-

|}

2005 UK Parliament result
The 2005 general election result was a gain for Peter Law as an independent candidate.

2003 Welsh Assembly constituency result
In 2003, Peter Law was re-elected as the Labour Assembly member for the Blaenau Gwent constituency. By announcing that he would stand as an Independent for the parliamentary constituency he expelled himself from the Labour Party (and the Labour Assembly grouping).

See also
List of United Kingdom by-elections (1979–2010)
Blaenau Gwent

References

External links
Peter Law Campaign literature from the 2005 general election
Campaign literature from the 2006 Parliamentary by-election
Campaign literature from the 2006 Welsh Assembly by-election
Blaenau Gwent Liberal Democrats

By-elections to the Senedd
By-elections to the Parliament of the United Kingdom in Welsh constituencies
Blaenau Gwent by-elections
Blaenau Gwent by-elections
2000s elections in Wales
Blaenau Gwent by-elections